Argyrospila is a genus of moths of the family Noctuidae.

Species
 Argyrospila striata Staudinger, 1897
 Argyrospila succinea (Esper, [1798])

References
 Argyrospila at Markku Savela's Lepidoptera and Some Other Life Forms
 Natural History Museum Lepidoptera genus database

Acronictinae